Melek is a municipality and village in the Nitra District of the south-west of Slovakia, in the Nitra Region.

References

Villages and municipalities in Nitra District